Eyes Cream is an alter ego of Italian dance music DJ/producer/composer/singer Agostino Carollo.  In 2000 he hit number-one on the Hot Dance Music/Club Play chart with "Fly Away (Bye Bye)."  This song was entirely written, produced, performed and sung by himself. The official videoclip was shot in Milano (Italy) and also featured his brother Francesco. He hit the dance chart Top 10 again in 2002 with "Open Up Your Mind," which peaked at number 10, featuring the vocals of Stephanie Haley.

Discography

Singles

See also
List of number-one dance hits (United States)
List of artists who reached number one on the US Dance chart

References

Italian house music groups

eyelid cream